Alfonso Antonio Dulanto Corzo (born 22 July 1969) is a retired Peruvian footballer who played as a central defender.

Club career
During his 16-year professional career, Dulanto rarely settled with a team. In his country, he played professionally for Club Hijos de Yurimaguas, Universitario (his biggest stint with any team, three years – he represented this team on three separate periods), Deportivo Municipal, Melgar (two stints), Estudiantes de Medicina and Universidad San Martín.

Abroad, he appeared for Mérida (Spain, Segunda División), Mexico's UNAM Pumas and APOEL of Cyprus, eventually retiring with USPM in 2005, at 36.

International career
Dulanto made 25 appearances for Peru, his debut coming on 5 May 1994, in a friendly match with Honduras. He appeared in two Copa América tournaments, helping the national side reach the semifinals in the 1997 edition, in Bolivia.

References

External links
 FutbolPeruano profile 
 
 
 

1969 births
Living people
Footballers from Lima
Peruvian footballers
Association football defenders
Club Universitario de Deportes footballers
CP Mérida footballers
Club Universidad Nacional footballers
APOEL FC players
Deportivo Municipal footballers
FBC Melgar footballers
Estudiantes de Medicina footballers
Club Deportivo Universidad de San Martín de Porres players
Peruvian Primera División players
Liga MX players
Cypriot First Division players
Peru international footballers
1995 Copa América players
1997 Copa América players
Peruvian expatriate footballers
Expatriate footballers in Spain
Expatriate footballers in Mexico
Expatriate footballers in Cyprus